The White Elster is a  long river in central Europe, right tributary of the Saale. Its source is in the westernmost part of the Czech Republic, in the territory of Hazlov. After a few kilometres, it flows into eastern Germany where it cuts through the Vogtland in (according to the Encyclopædia Britannica) a "deep and picturesque valley". In Germany it flows through the states of Saxony, Thuringia and Saxony-Anhalt. The White Elster flows through the cities of Plauen, Greiz, Gera, Zeitz, Pegau and Leipzig, and into the river Saale in Halle.

Name
Although "Elster" is German for "magpie", the origin of the name has nothing to do with the bird. It is of Slavic origin: alstrawa = hurrying water. The White Elster never meets the Black Elster, which flows from Lusatia into the River Elbe. The rivers have the names "white" and "black" to distinguish between them.

History 
The White Elster proved disastrous to the French troops when they retreated from Leipzig in October 1813, as a part of the Napoleonic Wars. Józef Poniatowski, Marshal of France, drowned in the river on 19 October 1813.

See also 
Black Elster
Elster glaciation
Leipzig River Network

References 

 
Rivers of the Karlovy Vary Region
Cheb District
Rivers of Saxony
Rivers of Saxony-Anhalt
Rivers of Thuringia
 
Rivers of Germany
International rivers of Europe